Frederick Henry Kessler (born June 25, 1998) is an American professional soccer player who plays as a center-back for Major League Soccer club New England Revolution.

Club career
Born in New York City, New York, Kessler began playing soccer in the New York Red Bulls academy, where he played for five years before moving to Beachside Soccer Club in Norwalk, Connecticut.

Prior to college, Kessler considered entering Harvard University but elected to join the University of Virginia after being recruited to play for the Virginia Cavaliers. While in college, Kessler also played two seasons with USL Premier Development League side AC Connecticut.

New England Revolution
On December 30, 2019, Kessler signed a Generation Adidas contract with Major League Soccer and entered the 2020 MLS SuperDraft. On January 9, 2020, Kessler was selected 6th overall in the draft by the New England Revolution.

Kessler made his professional debut for the Revolution on February 29, 2020 in their opening match against the Montreal Impact. He scored his first career professional goal, also against the Montreal Impact, on September 23, 2020.

International career
Kessler was named to the final 20-player United States U23 roster for the 2020 CONCACAF Men's Olympic Qualifying Championship in March 2021. He was previously eligible for the Republic of Ireland national team with his mother being an Irish citizen.

Kessler was added to the United States national team for the quarterfinal round of the 2021 Gold Cup, pending CONCACAF approval, replacing an injured Walker Zimmerman. Kessler was cap-tied to the United States by making his senior debut as an extra-time substitute to close out their 2021 CONCACAF Gold Cup Final victory over Mexico.

Career statistics

Club

International

Honors
New England Revolution
Supporters' Shield: 2021

United States
CONCACAF Gold Cup: 2021

References

External links
Profile at the New England Revolution website

1998 births
Living people
Soccer players from New York City
American soccer players
Association football defenders
AC Connecticut players
New England Revolution players
USL League Two players
Major League Soccer players
United States men's under-23 international soccer players
American people of German descent
CONCACAF Gold Cup-winning players
Virginia Cavaliers men's soccer players